Bent District is a district (bakhsh) in Nik Shahr County, Sistan and Baluchestan province, Iran. At the 2006 census, its population was 21,259, in 4,359 families. At the 2016 census, its population had risen to 28,722. The district has one city: Bent. The district has three rural districts (dehestan): Bent Rural District, Dastgerd Rural District, and Tutan and Mohammadan Rural District.

References 

Nik Shahr County
Districts of Sistan and Baluchestan Province
Populated places in Nik Shahr County